Aphroditidae is a family of annelids belonging to the order Phyllodocida.

Genera

Genera:
 Aphrodita Linnaeus, 1758
 Aphrogenia Kinberg, 1856
 Cyanippa Lucas, 1840

References

Annelids